NEJM Journal Watch is a series of topic-specific newsletters written for physicians and other health professionals. It is published by the Massachusetts Medical Society and is a sibling publication to the New England Journal of Medicine.

NEJM Journal Watch distributes its products via print, e-mail, and its website.

Mission 
The goal of NEJM Journal Watch is to provide physicians and allied health professionals with current, clinically focused information and commentary regarding their respective practice areas and medical disciplines. The organization accomplishes this by utilizing a board of physicians and editors who monitor scientific and medical journals for relevant articles, summarize the articles, and provide additional commentary about the topic.

NEJM Journal Watch divides its content into areas of primary care, specialty care, and specific watch topics.

Editorial Board 
The editor-in-chief is Allan S. Brett. Thomas L. Schwenk is Deputy Editor and Anthony L. Komaroff is Founding Editor.

Primary Care 
NEJM Journal Watch focuses on four specific areas of primary care:
 General Medicine
 Pediatrics and Adolescent Medicine
 Women's Health
 Hospital Medicine

Specialty Care 
NEJM Journal Watch creates content in eight different specialty care areas:
 Cardiology
 Dermatology
 Emergency Medicine
 Gastroenterology
 Infectious Diseases
 Neurology
 Psychiatry

Watch Topics 
In addition to primary and specialty care areas, NEJM Journal Watch maintains a current database of journal articles and commentary for several important medical topics:
 Aging & geriatrics
 Allergies & asthma
 Bone and joint disease
 Breast cancer
 Depression & anxiety
 Diabetes
 GERD
 Gynecology
 Hepatitis
 Lipid management
 Nutrition & obesity
 Pediatric infections
 Peptic ulcers
 Pregnancy & infertility
 Respiratory infections
 Sexually transmitted diseases
 Skin cancer
 Stroke
 Substance abuse

See also 
 List of medical journals

External links 
 NEJM Journal Watch - Official Site
 New England Journal of Medicine - Sibling publication to Journal Watch
 Massachusetts Medical Society - Publisher of NEJM Journal Watch and NEJM

References 

General medical journals